The 2008 AFC U-19 Championship the 35th edition of this tournament organized by the Asian Football Confederation (AFC), was hosted by Saudi Arabia between 31 October and 14 November. The matches were played in Dammam and Khobar, both located at the Eastern Province.

Qualification Competition

Seedings

Draw
The draw was held on 6 April 2008 in Dammam, Saudi Arabia.

Venues

Squads

Group stage
All times are local (UTC+3).

Group A

Group B

Group C

Group D

Knockout stage

Quarterfinal

Semifinal

Final

Winners

Qualified to the 2009 FIFA U-20 World Cup

Awards

Goalscorers
4 goals

 Ahmed Khalil
 Kensuke Nagai

3 goals

 Zhou Liao
 Ali Oudah
 Kota Mizunuma
 Samad Shohzukhurov

2 goals

 Sherzod Karimov
 Mitch Nichols
 Nawaf Al-Abid
 Abdulrahim Jaizawi
 Ehsan Hajsafi
 Iman Mousavi
 An Il-Bom
 Mohamed Fawzi
 Hamdan Al Kamali

1 goal

 Milos Lujic
 Sebastian Ryall
 Sam Munro
 Tahj Minniecon
 Cao Yunding
 Hui Jiakang
 Piao Cheng
 Tan Yang
 Zhang Yuan
 Jalaleddin Ali-Mohammadi
 Kosuke Yamamoto
 Jun Suzuki
 Hiroki Miyazawa
 Amer Abu Hwaiti
 Yusuf Al-Rawashdeh
 Khalil Bani Attiah
 Yu Ji-No
 Choi Jung-Han
 Cho Young-Cheol
 Kim Young-Gwon
 Kim Dong-Sub
 Kim Bo-Kyung
 Moon Ki-Han
 Mohammed Abusabaan
 Omar Khudari
 Mohammed Al-Qarni
 Kassem Mannaa
 Ahmad Zreik
 Jo Jong-Chol
 Ri Sang-Chol
 Ri Hyong-Mu
 Myong Cha-Hyon
 Omar Al Soma
 Davrondzhon Tukhtasunov
 Farkhod Tokhirov
 Farkhod Vasiev
 Yodrak Namueangrak
 Anusorn Srichaloung
 Attapong Nooprom
 Theyab Awana
 Rashed Eisa
 Habib Fardan
 Abdulaziz Haikal
 Davron Mirzaev
 Fozil Musaev
 Kenja Turaev
 Abdullah Mousa

Own goal
 Farkhod Vasiev (playing against China)

References

External links
Details on AFC.com

 
2008
Youth
2008
October 2008 sports events in Asia
November 2008 sports events in Asia
2008 in youth association football